Fonsorbes is a commune of the Haute-Garonne department in southwestern France.

Population

The inhabitants of the commune are known as Fonsorbais.

Twin towns
Fonsorbes is twinned with:
 La Fatarella, Spain (Since 1994).

See also
Communes of the Haute-Garonne department

References

External links

Communes of Haute-Garonne